The New Delhi Institute of Management (NDIM) is a state   not-for-profit business school in Tughlakabad, New Delhi. Established in 1992, NDIM offers AICTE-approved 2-year full-time PGDM. The PGDM at NDIM is approved by the AICTE since 1996, declared equivalent to MBA by the AICTE in 2008, and is internationally accredited by ASIC, The UK with Premier College Status. The Nearest metro station is at Saket, Govindpuri, and GK-2.

Programs
 Post Graduate Diploma in Management (PGDM) 
 Post Graduate Diploma in Management-Marketing (PGDM Marketing)
 Post Graduate Diploma in Management-Finance (PGDM Finance)
 MBA with Dual Specialization in HR, Marketing, Finance, IT & Systems, Media Marketing & Communication, Digital Marketing, Business Analytics, Logistics-Supply Chain Management & Operations, International Business.

Rankings and accreditation
NDIM was awarded by the AICTE-CII two years in a row (2017 & 2018) as the Best Industry Linked Management Institute of India.

The PGDM at NDIM is declared equivalent to MBA by the Association of Indian Universities (AIU) and accredited by the National Board of Accreditation (NBA). MBA at NDIM is internationally accredited by the International rating body, ASIC(UK), with Premier College Status. It is ranked amongst the Top 10 B-Schools and 7th amongst the Top Private B-Schools of India by Business World, June 2013. It is ranked as the 12th Best Private B-School in India and 3rd Best Private B-School in North India by AIMA-Business Standard, June 2015. NDIM's Industry Interface and Scale of Operations ranked as No.1 in India by AIMA-Business Standard, June 2015.

WCRC Leaders-Asia & KPMG ranked NDIM amongst the Fastest Growing B-Schools of Asia, January 2014.

Board of Directors and Executive Council 
NDIM Board is includes 7 former Chief Secretaries and Secretaries to the Govt. of India., eminent educationalists, industrialists, management consultants and former governors.
Suresh Prabhu Union Minister of Commerce & Industry and Civil Aviation. Former Railway Minister of India
T. K. A. Nair Secretary in the Prime Minister's Office
S. P. Oswal Chairman & Managing Director of Vardhman Spinning & General Mills Ltd
Tarlochan Singh MP, Rajya Sabha
Padma shri Harshavardhan Neotia Chairman Ambuja Neotia Group
Mahesh Gupta Chairman Kent RO Systems
Sirajuddin Qureshi President, India Islamic Culture Centre
[Tarun Vijay. MP Directorof the Dr. Syamaprasad Mookherjee Research Foundation, member of Rajya Sabha
Hemant Kanoria Chairman, Managing Director of SERI Infrastructure Finance Ltd.
Ashok Chandra IAS, Sec'y Govt. of India
Major Gen. D.N. Khurana AVSM, Ex-Dir. General AIMA ; Secretary General Asia Association of Management Associations
I.K Rasgotra Sec'y Govt. of India (Retd.) Ministry of Personnel and Administrative Reforms

References

External links
Official website of NDIM
NDIM Admission Process

Business schools in Delhi
Educational institutions established in 1992
1992 establishments in Delhi